The Deutscher Bauernverband) (DBV -  German Farmers' Association) is the largest agricultural and forestry professional association in the Federal Republic of Germany. It is the umbrella organization of the 18 regional farmers' associations. More than 90% of all German agricultural operations (about 270.000, 380.000 farmers) are members of DBV on a voluntary basis. Besides its headquarters in Berlin, the DBV also runs an office in Brussels.The DBV is the major German interest group, lobbying and professional association of farmers in Germany. The German Farmers' Association (DBV) represents conventional and ecological farmers. However, the political focus is on conventional agriculture. Organic farmers are organized in the Bund Ökologische Lebensmittelwirtschaft (BÖLW).

Precursors and related historical associations
Association of the German Farmers Associations (1900-1934)
German Farmers' Party (1928-1933)
Christian-National Peasants' and Farmers' Party (1928-1932)
Agricultural League (Reichslandbund) (1921-1933)
Landbund, Austrian political party during the period of the First Republic (1918–1934). 
Reichsnährstand, Nazi organisation (1933-1945)
Democratic Farmers' Party of Germany, East German (GDR) political party (1948-1990)

From 1967 to 1979 Constantin Heereman von Zuydtwyck was president of Deutscher Bauernverband.

Memberships
GEFA (German Export Association for Food and Agriproducts) 
COPA-COGECA
WFO

See also
German Agricultural Society (DLG)
Andreas Hermes, first president of the DBV
Common Agricultural Policy

References

Agricultural organisations based in Germany
Lobbying organizations in Europe
1948 establishments in Germany